Abington Heights High School is a moderate-sized public high school. It serves the boroughs of Clarks Green and Clarks Summit and the townships of Waverly Township, Glenburn Township, Newton Township, North Abington Township, Ransom Township and South Abington Township in Lackawanna County, Pennsylvania. It is the sole high school operated by the Abington Heights School District.

In 2016, AHHS enrollment was reported as 1,047 pupils in 9th through 12th grades. The school employed 76 teachers.

The school is served by Northeastern Intermediate Unit IU19, which provides special education services, preemployment screening for future employees, inservice training and other services.  The school offers its own Vocational Technical Program, where students prepare to take NOCTI Assessments.

Extracurricular Activities
Abington Heights High School offers a wide variety of clubs, activities and an extensive, publicly funded sports program.

Sports
The District funds:

Varsity

Boys
Baseball - AAAAA
Basketball - AAAAA
Cross Country - AAA
Football - AAAAA
Golf - AAA
Indoor Track and Field - AAAA
Lacrosse - AA
Soccer - AAA
Swimming and Diving - AAA
Tennis - AAA
Track and Field - AAA
Volleyball - AA
Wrestling	- AAA

Girls
Basketball - AAAAA
Cross Country - AAA
Field Hockey - AA
Indoor Track and Field - AAA
Lacrosse - AA
Soccer (Fall) - AAA
Softball - AAAAA
Swimming and Diving - AAA
Girls' Tennis - AAA
Track and Field - AAA
Volleyball - AAA

According to PIAA directory September 2017

References

Educational institutions established in 1966
1966 establishments in Pennsylvania
Public high schools in Pennsylvania